Below is a list of chess openings named after places.  The Oxford Companion to Chess lists 1,327 named chess openings and variants. Many of them are named for geographic places.

A

Aachen Gambit of the Nimzowitsch Defense 1.e4 Nc6 2.d4 d5 3.exd5 Nb4
Abbazia Defense of the King's Gambit 1.e4 e5 2.f4 exf4 3.Nf3 d5
American Gambit of the Dutch Defense 1.d4 f5 2.e4 fxe4 3.Nd2
Adelaide Counter-Gambit of the King's Gambit 1.e4 e5 2.f4 Nc6 3.Nf3 f5
Amsterdam Variation of the Sicilian Defence, Dragon Variation 1.e4 c5 2.Nf3 d6 3.d4 cxd4 4.Nxd4 Nf6 5.Nc3 g6 6.Be3 Bg7 7.Be2 Nc6 8.Qd2
Arkhangelsk Defense (or Archangel Defense) of the Ruy Lopez 1.e4 e5 2.Nf3 Nc6 3.Bb5 a6 4.Ba4 Nf6 5.0-0 b5 6.Bb3 Bb7
Argentine Gambit of the Baltic Defense 1.d4 d5 2.c4 Bf5 3.cxd5 Bxb1 4.Qa4+ c6 5.dxc6 Nxc6
Argentine Variation of the Cambridge Springs Defense 1.d4 d5 2.c4 e6 3.Nc3 Nf6 4.Bg5 Nbd7 5.e3 c6 6.Nf3 Qa5 7.Nd2 Bb4 8.Qc2 0-0 9.Bh4
Armenian Variation of the French Defence 1.e4 e6 2.d4 d5 3.Nc3 Bb4 4.e5 c5 5.a3 Ba5
Australian Gambit of the King's Gambit 1.e4 e5 2.f4 exf4 3.Nf3 g5 4.Bc4 g4 5.h4
Austrian Attack in the Pirc Defense 1.e4 d6 2.d4 Nf6 3.Nc3 g6 4.f4
Austrian Defense of the Queen's Gambit Declined 1.d4 d5 2.c4 c5

B

Baltic Defense 1.d4 d5 2.c4 Bf5 (named for the Baltic countries)
Baltic Opening (or Dunst Opening) 1.Nc3
Basque Gambit of the Ruy Lopez 1.e4 e5 2.Nf3 Nc6 3.Bb5 a6 4.Ba4 Nf6 5.O-O Be7 6.d4 exd4 7.e5 Ne4 8.c3
Basque Opening 1.d4 Nf6 2.b3
Battambang Opening 1. Nc3 e5 2. a3
Bavarian Gambit 1.e4 e5 2.c4 d5
Belgrade Gambit 1.e4 e5 2.Nf3 Nc6 3.Nc3 Nf6 4.d4 exd4 5.Nd5!?
Benelux Variation of the Ruy Lopez 1.e4 e5 2.Nf3 Nc6 3.Bb5 Bc5 4.c3 Nf6 5.0-0 0-0 6.d4 Bb6 (named for the Benelux countries)
Berlin Variation of the Ruy Lopez 1.e4 e5 2.Nf3 Nc6 3.Bb5 Nf6
Beverwijk Variation of the Ruy Lopez (Berlin Variation)  1.e4 e5 2.Nf3 Nc6 3.Bb5 Nf6 4.0-0 Bc5
Birmingham Defence (more commonly as the St. George Defence): 1. e4 a6
Birmingham Gambit 1.b4 c5
Brazilian Defense 1.e4 e5 2.Nf3 Qe7!?
Bremen Variation of the English Opening 1.c4 e5 2.Nc3 Nf6 3.g3
Breslau Variation of the Ruy Lopez 1.e4 e5 2.Nf3 Nc6 3.Bb5 a6 4.Ba4 Nf6 5.O-O Nxe4 6.d4 b5 7.Bb3 d5 8.dxe5 Be6 9.c3 Be7 10.Re1 O-O 11.Nd4 Nxe5 
Brooklyn Defense of the Alekhine's Defence 1.e4 Nf6 2.e5 Ng8
Brussels Gambit of the Sicilian Defence 1.e4 c5 2.Nf3 f5
Budapest Gambit 1.d4 Nf6 2.c4 e5
Bulgarian Variation of the Ruy Lopez 1.e4 e5 2.Nf3 Nc6 3.Bb5 a5

C

Calabrian Countergambit of the Bishop's Opening 1.e4 e5 2.Bc4 f5
Cambridge Gambit of the Alekhine's Defence 1.e4 Nf6 2.e5 Nd5 3.d4 d6 4.c4 Nb6 5.f4 g5
Cambridge Springs Variation of the Queen's Gambit Declined 1.d4 d5 2.c4 e6 3.Nc3 Nf6 4.Bg5 Nbd7 5.Nf3 c6 6.e3 Qa5
Carlsbad Variation of the Slav Defense 1.d4 d5 2.c4 c6 3.Nf3 Nf6 4.Nc3 dxc4 5.a4 Bf5 6.Ne5 Nbd7 7.Nxc4 Qc7 8.g3 e5 
Catalan Opening 1.d4 Nf6 2.c4 e6 3.g3 d5 4.Bg2 
Chelyabinsk Variation of the Sicilian Defence 1.e4 c5 2.Nf3 Nc6 3.d4 cxd4 4.Nxd4 Nf6 5.Nc3 e5 6.Ndb5 d6 7.Bg5 a6 8.Na3 b5
Chicago Gambit (or Irish Gambit) 1.e4 e5 2.Nf3 Nc6 3.Nxe5?
Chicago Defense to the Smith-Morra Gambit against the Sicilian Defence 1.e4 c5 2.d4 cxd4 3.c3 dxc3 4.Nxc3 e6 5.Nf3 d6 6.Bc4 a6 7.0-0 b5 8.Bb3 Nc6 9.Qe2 Be7 10.Rd1 Ra7
Chinese Variation of the Pirc Defense 1.e4 d6 2.d4 Nf6 3.Nc3 g6 4.Be2 Bg7 5.g4!?
Chinese Variation of the Sicilian Defence, Dragon Variation 1.e4 c5 2.Nf3 d6 3.d4 cxd4 4.Nxd4 Nf6 5.Nc3 g6 6.Be3 Bg7 7.f3 0-0 8.Qd2 Nc6 9.Bc4 Bd7 10.0-0-0 Rb8 
Clarendon Court Variation of the Benoni Defense 1.d4 c5 2.d5 f5
Cologne Gambit of the Ware Opening 1.a4 b6 2.d4 d5 2.Nc3 Nd7
Colorado Defense of the Nimzowitsch Defense 1.e4 Nc6 2.Nf3 f5
Copenhagen Defense of the Danish Gambit 1.e4 e5 2.d4 exd4 3.c3 dxc3 4.Bc4 cxb2 5.Bxb2 Bb4+
Cracow Variation of the Italian Game 1.e4 e5 2.Nf3 Nc6 3.Bc4 Bc5 4.c3 Nf6 5.d4 exd4 6.cxd4 Bb4+ 7.Kf1?!
Czech Defence The term used by Siegbert Tarrasch for the Slav Defense, 1.d4 d5 2.c4 c6
Czech Defence (Pribyl System) of the Pirc Defence 1.e4 d6 2.d4 Nf6 3.Nc3 c6 
Czech Variation Slav Defense 1.d4 d5 2.c4 c6 3.Nc3 Nf6 4.Nf3 dxc4 5.a4 Bf5 Slav Defense: Modern, Alapin Variation, Czech Variation
Czech Defence of the Polish opening 1. b4 e5 2. Bb2 d6
Czech Variation of the Benoni Defense 1. d4 Nf6 2. c4 c5 3. d5 e5
Czech-Indian Variation of the Indian Game 1.d4 Nf6 2.Nf3 c6
Czech Variation of the Old Indian Defence 1.d4 Nf6 2.c4 d6 3.Nc3 c6

D

Danish Gambit 1.e4 e5 2.d4 exd4 3.c3
Danube Gambit 1.d4 Nf6 2.c4 g6 3.d5 b5 4.cxb5 a6 5.bxa6 c6
Dresden Opening 1.e4 e5 2.Nf3 Nc6 3.c4
Duisburg Gambit of the QGD 1.d4 d5 2.c4 e6 3.Nc3 c5 4.cxd5 cxd4
Dutch Defense 1.d4 f5
Dutch Variation of the Slav Defense 1.d4 d5 2.c4 c6 3.Nc3 Nf6 4.Nf3 dxc4 5.a4 Bf5 6.e3

E

Edinburgh Variation of the Caro-Kann Defence 1.e4 c6 2.d4 d5 3. Nd2 Qb6
English Attack of the Sicilian Defence, Najdorf Variation 1.e4 c5 2.Nf3 d6 3.d4 cxd4 4.Nxd4 Nf6 5.Nc3 a6 6.Be3 and 7.f3
English Defense 1.d4 e6 2.c4 b6
English Opening 1.c4

F

Finnish Variation of the Caro-Kann Defence 1.e4 c6 2.d4 d5 3.Nc3 dxe4 4.Nxe4 h6
Florentine Gambit of the King's Indian Defence 1.d4 Nf6 2.c4 g6 3.Nc3 Bg7 4.e4 d6 5.f4 0-0 6.Be2 c5 7.d5 e6 8.Nf3 exd5 9.e5
Fort Knox Variation of the French Defence 1. e4 e6 2. d4 d5 3. Nc3 dxe4 4. Nxe4 Bd7 5. Nf3 Bc6 
Franco-Benoni 1.e4 e6 2.d4 c5
Frankfurt Variation of the French Defence 1. e4 e6 2. d4 d5 3. Nc3 Nf6 4. Bg5 Be7 5. e5 Ng8 6. Be3 b6 
French Defence 1.e4 e6

G
Genoa Opening (known as Grob's Attack): 1. g4
Gent Gambit of the Amar Opening (Paris) 1. Nh3 d5 2. g3 e5 3. f4 Bxh3 4. Bxh3 exf4 5. O-O fxg3 6. hxg3
German Defense of the Polish Sokolsky Opening 1. b4 d5 2. Bb2 Qd6 3. a3 e5 4. Nf3 e4 5. Nd4 Nf6 6. c4! dxc4 7. e3 Be7 8. Bxc4 O-O 9. Nc3
Glasgow Kiss Variation of the Slav Defense 1.d4 d5 2.c4 c6 3.Nc3 Nf6 4.e3 Bf5 5.cxd5 cxd5 6.Qb3 Nc6
Gothenburg Variation of the Sicilian Defence, Najdorf Variation 1.e4 c5 2.Nf3 d6 3.d4 cxd4 4.Nxd4 Nf6 5.Nc3 a6 6.Bg5 e6 7.f4 Be7 8.Qf3 h6 9.Bh4 g5
Greek Defense (or Owen's Defense) 1.e4 b6
Guatemala Defence of Owen's Defence 1.e4 b6 2.d4 Ba6

H

Hastings Variation of the Queen's Gambit Declined 1.d4 d5 2.c4 e6 3.Nf3 Nf6 4.Bg5 h6 5.Bxf6 Qxf6 8.Nc3 c6 7.Qb3
Hungarian Attack: a system popularised by the Hungarian GM Forintos and characterised by an early Nge2 against the King's Indian Defense.
Hungarian Defense 1.e4 e5 2.Nf3 Nc6 3.Bc4 Be7
Hungarian Opening (or Benko's Opening) 1. g3
Hungarian Variation of the Sicilian Defence 1.e4 c5 2.Nf3 d6 3.d4 cxd4 4.Qxd4

I

Icelandic Gambit 1.e4 d5 2.exd5 Nf6 3.c4 e6!?
Indian Defenses: a complex of chess openings beginning 1.d4 Nf6, including the Nimzo-Indian Defense, Queen's Indian Defense, King's Indian Defense, Bogo-Indian Defense, Old Indian Defense, Janowski Indian Defense, etc.
Inverted Hungarian Opening 1.e4 e5 2.Nf3 Nc6 3.Be2
Irish Gambit (or Chicago Gambit) 1.e4 e5 2.Nf3 Nc6 3.Nxe5?
Israeli Gambit (or Halasz Gambit) 1.e4 e5 2.d4 exd4 3.f4 
Italian Gambit 1.e4 e5 2.Nf3 Nc6 3.Bc4 Bc5 4.d4?!
Italian Game 1.e4 e5 2.Nf3 Nc6 3.Bc4 (Bc5)

J

Jalalabad Defense 1.e4 e5 2.Nf3 c5, or 1.e4 c5 2.Nf3 e5

K

Kentucky Opening 1.e4 e5 2.Nf3 Nc6 3.Bc4 Bc5 4.Bxf7+? Kxf7 5.Nxe5+ Nxe5
Kiel Variation of the Scandinavian Defense 1.e4 d5 2.exd5 Nf6 3.d4 Nxd5 4.c4 Nb4

L

Leipzig Gambit (or Müller-Schulze Gambit) 1.e4 e5 2.Nf3 Nc6 3.Nc3 Nf6 4.Nxe5?!
Lemberger Gambit (Lvov Gambit) 1.Nf3 Nf6 2.e4 or 1.Nf3 d5 2.e4
Latvian Gambit 1.e4 e5 2.Nf3 f5
Leningrad Variation of the Dutch Defense 1.d4 f5 2.g3 g6
Lisbon Gambit 1.d4 d6 2.c4 e5 3.dxe5 Nc6
Lithuanian Variation of the Mikėnas Defense 1.d4 Nc6 2.c4 e5 3.d5 Nce7
Lodz Variation of the Tarrasch Defense 1.d4 d5 2.c4 e6 3.Nc3 c5 4.cxd5 exd5 5.Nf3 Nc6 6.g3
London System, a set of related chess openings characterized by 1.d4 followed by an early Bf4, e.g. 1.d4 d5 2.Nf3 Nf6 3.Bf4; 1.d4 Nf6 2.Nf3 e6 3.Bf4; and 1.d4 Nf6 2.Nf3 g6 3.Bf4

M

Maltese Falcon Attack (or Gibbins-Wiedehagen Gambit) 1.d4 Nf6 2.g4 Nxg4 3.f3 Nf6 4.e4
Manhattan Gambit of the Dutch Defense 1.d4 f5 2.Qd3 Nf6 3.g4
Manhattan Variation of the QGD (also called the Westphalia Defense) 1.d4 d5 2.c4 e6 3.Nc3 Nf6 4.Bg5 Nbd7 5.Nf3 Bb4 or 5.e3 Bb4
Mannheim Variation of the QGA 1.d4 d5 2.c4 dxc4 3.Nf3 Nf6 4.Qa4+
Mar del Plata Variation of the King's Indian Defence 1. d4 Nf6 2. c4 g6 3. Nc3 Bg7 4. e4 d6 5. Nf3 0–0 6. Be2 e5 7. 0–0 Nc6 8. d5 Ne7
Margate Variation of the Sicilian Defence 1.e4 c5 2.Nf3 d6 3.d4 cxd4 4.Nxd4 Nf6 5.Nc3 Nc6 6.Bg5 e6 7.Bb5
Marienbad Variation of the Sicilian Defence 1.e4 c5 2.b4 cxb4 3.a3 d5 4.exd5 Qxd5 5.Bb2 
Massachusetts Defense of the Caro-Kann Defence 1.e4 c6 2.d4 f5
Mediterranean Defense 1.e4 e6 2.d4 Nf6
Meran Variation of the Semi-Slav Defense 1.d4 d5 2.c4 c6 3.Nf3 Nf6 4.Nc3 e6 5.e3 Nbd7 6.Bd3 dxc4 7.Bxc4
Mexican Defense 1.d4 Nf6 2.c4 Nc6
Miami Variation of the Italian Gambit 1.e4 e5 2.Nf3 Nc6 3.Bc4 Bc5 4.d4 Bxd4 5.Nxd4 Nxd4 6.Be3
Montevideo Defense 1.d4 Nc6 2.d5 Nb8
Modern Archangel Defense of the Ruy Lopez 1.e4 e5 2.Nf3 Nc6 3.Bb5 a6 4.Ba4 Nf6 5.0-0 b5 6.Bb3 Bc5
Moscow Variation of the Semi-Slav Defense 1.d4 d5 2.c4 c6 3.Nf3 Nf6 4.Nf3 e6 5.Bg5 h6
Moscow Variation of the Sicilian Defence 1.e4 c5 2.Nf3 d6 3.Bb5+

N

New Castle Gambit of the (French Defense Tarrasch variation) 1.e4 e6 2.d4 d5 3.Nd2 e5
Nordic Gambit 1.e4 e5 2.d4 exd4 3.c3 (alternative name for the Danish Gambit)
North Sea Variation of the Modern Defense 1.e4 g6 2.d4 Nf6 3.e5 Nh5
Norwegian Defense 1.e4 g6 2.d4 Nf6, intending 3.e5 Nh5!? and if 4.g4!?, Ng7
Norwegian Defense of the Ruy Lopez 1.e4 e5 2.Nf3 Nc6 3.Bb5 a6 4.Ba4 b5 5.Bb3 Na5
Norwegian Gambit 1.e4 e5 2.d4 exd4 3.c3 (alternative name for the Danish Gambit)
Nottingham Variation of the Sicilian Defence, Dragon Variation 1.e4 c5 2.Nf3 d6 3.d4 cxd4 4.Nxd4 Nf6 5.Nc3 g6 6.Be3 Bg7 7.Be2 Nc6 8.Nb3  
Novosibirsk Variation of the Dunst Opening 1.Nc3 c5 2.d4 cxd4 3.Qxd4 Nc6 4.Qh4 
Novosibirsk Variation of the Sicilian Defense 1.e4 c5 2.Nf3 Nc6 3.d4 cxd4 4.Nxd4 Nf6 5.Nc3 e5 6.Ndb5 d6 7.Bg5 a6 8.Na3 b5 9.Bxf6 gxf6 10.Nd5 Bg7
Nuremberg Variation of the Ruy Lopez 1.e4 e5 2.Nf3 Nc6 3.Bb5 f6

O

Oxford Gambit of the Four Knights Game 1.e4 e5 2.Nf3 Nc6 3.Nc3 Nf6 4.d4 Bb4 5.d5 Nd4
Oxford Variation of the Vienna Game 1.e4 e5 2.Nc3 Nf6 3.f4 d5 4.fxe5 Nxe4 5.d3

P

Paris Defence (or Semi-Italian Opening) 1.e4 e5 2.Nf3 Nc6 3.Bc4 d6 
Paris Gambit 1.Nh3 d5 2.g3 e5 3.f4!? (intending 3...Bxh3 4.Bxh3 exf4 5.0-0) 
Paris Opening (or Amar Opening) 1.Nh3
Peruvian Variation of the Queen's Gambit Declined 1.d4 d5 2.c4 e6 3.Nc3 Nf6 4.Bg5 c5
Podebrady Variation of the Sicilian Defence 1.e4 c5 2.Nf3 d6 3.d4 cxd4 4.Nxd4 Nf6 5.Nc3 Nc6 6.Bg5 e6 7.Nb3
Polish Defense 1.d4 b5 or 1.Nf3 Nf6 2.g3 b5
Polish Gambit 1. e4 b5?! 2. Bxb5 c6
Polish Opening (or Orangutan) 1.b4
Portuguese Gambit of the Scandinavian Defense 1.e4 d5 2.exd5 Nf6 3.d4 Bg4 4.f3 Bf5 5.Bb5+ Nbd7
Portuguese Opening 1.e4 e5 2.Bb5
Prague Variation of the Tarrasch Defense 1.d4 d5 2.c4 e6 3.Nc3 c5 4.cxd5 exd5 5.Nf3 Nc6 6.g3 Nf6
Prussian Game (or Two Knights Defense) 1.e4 e5 2.Nf3 Nc6 3.Bc4 Nf6

R

Riga Variation of the Ruy Lopez 1.e4 e5 2.Nf3 Nc6 3.Bb5 a6 4.Ba4 Nf6 5.0-0 Nxe4 6.d4 exd4
Rio de Janeiro Variation of the Ruy Lopez 1.e4 e5 2.Nf3 Nc6 3.Bb5 Nf6 4.O-O Nxe4 5.d4 Be7
Romanian Opening (or Dunst Opening) 1.Nc3
Russian Defense of the Ruy Lopez 1.e4 e5 2.Nf3 Nc6 3.Bb5 a6 4.Ba4 Nf6 5.0-0 d6
Russian Game (or Petrov's Defense) 1.e4 e5 2.Nf3 Nf6

S

San Francisco Gambit of the Sicilian Defence 1.e4 c5 2.Nf3 Nc6 3.Bb5 Na5 4.b4
Saragossa Opening 1.c3
Scandinavian Defense 1.e4 d5
Scheveningen Variation of the Sicilian Defence 1.e4 c5 2.Nf3 d6 3.d4 cxd4 4.Nxd4 Nf6 5.Nc3 e6
Scotch Four Knights Game 1.e4 e5 2.Nf3 Nc6 3.Nc3 Nf6 4.d4
Scotch Gambit 1.e4 e5 2.Nf3 Nc6 3.d4 exd4 4.Bc4
Scotch Game 1.e4 e5 2.Nf3 Nc6 3.d4
Semi-Slav Defense 1.d4 d5 2.c4 c6 3.Nc3 (or 3.Nf3) e6
Semmering Variation of the Semi-Slav Defense 1.d4 d5 2.c4 e6 3.Nf3 Nf6 4.e3 c6 5.Nbd2 Nbd7 6.Bd3 c5
Seville Variation of the Grünfeld Defence 1.d4 Nf6 2.c4 g6 3.Nc3 d5 4.cxd5 Nxd5 5.e4 Nxc3 6.bxc3 Bg7 7.Bc4 c5 8.Ne2 Nc6 9.Be3 O-O 10.O-O Bg4 11.f3 Na5 12.Bxf7+ 
Siberian Attack of the Indian Defence 1.d4 Nf6 2.Qd3 d5 3.Nc3
Siberian Trap in the Smith-Morra Gambit against the Sicilian Defence 1.e4 c5 2.d4 cxd4 3.c3 dxc3 4.Nxc3 Nc6 5.Nf3 e6 6.Bc4 Qc7 7.0-0 Nf6 8.Qe2 Ng4! 9.h3?? (or 9.Bb3??) Nd4!
Sicilian Defence 1.e4 c5
Slav Defense 1.d4 d5 2.c4 c6
Spanish Game (or Ruy Lopez) 1.e4 e5 2.Nf3 Nc6 3.Bb5
Stockholm Variation of the Grünfeld Defence 1.d4 Nf6 2.c4 g6 3.Nc3 d5 4.Nf3 Bg7 5.Bg5
St. Petersburg Variation of the Ruy Lopez 1.e4 e5 2.Nf3 Nc6 3.Bb5 a6 4.Ba4 Nf6 5.O-O Nxe4 6.d4 b5 7.Bb3 d5 8.dxe5 Be6 9.c3 Bc5 10.Nbd2
Swedish Variation of the QGD, Tarrasch Defense 1.d4 d5 2.c4 e6 3.Nc3 c5 4.cxd5 exd5 5.Nf3 Nc6 6.g3 c4
Swiss Gambit of the Bird's Opening 1.f4 f5 2.e4!? 
Swiss Variation of the French Defence 1. e4 e6 2. d4 d5 3. Nc3 Nf6 4. Bd3

T

Tashkent Attack of the King's Gambit 1.e4 e5 2.f4 exf4 3.Nf3 Nf6 4.e5 Nh5 5.g4
Tübingen Gambit of the Dunst Opening 1.Nc3 Nf6 2.g4

U

Ukrainian Variation of the Old Indian Defense 1.d4 Nf6 2.c4 d6 3.Nc3 e5 4.Nf3

V

Valencia Opening (or Mieses Opening) 1.d3 e5 2.Nd2
Venezolana Variation of the Mieses Opening 1.d3 c5 2.Nc3 Nc6 3.g3
Venice Attack of the Sicilian Defence 1.e4 c5 2.Nf3 d6 3.d4 cxd4 4.Nxd4 Nf6 5.f3 e5 6.Bb5+ or 1.e4 c5 2.Nf3 d6 3.d4 cxd4 4.Nxd4 Nf6 5.Nc3 e5 6.Bb5+
Venice Variation of the Queen's Gambit Declined 1.d4 d5 2.c4 e6 3.Nc3 Nf6 4.Bg5 c5 5.cxd5 Qb6
Vienna Game 1.e4 e5 2.Nc3
Vienna Variation of the Queen's Gambit Declined 1.d4 d5 2.c4 e6 3.Nc3 Nf6 4.Nf3 Bb4 5. Bg5 dxc4 6. e4
Vinohrady Variation of the Sicilian Defence 1.e4 c5 2.Nc3 Nc6 3.g4 named after a district in Prague
Volga Gambit 1.d4 Nf6 2.c4 c5 3.d5 b5 (named for the Volga River, the national river of Russia)
Voronezh Variation of the Alekhine's Defence 1.e4 Nf6 2.e5 Nd5 3.d4 d6 4.c4 Nb6 5.exd6 cxd6 6.Nc3 g6 7.Be3 Bg7 8.Rc1 0-0 9.b3

W

Warsaw Variation of the Dutch Defense 1.d4 f5 2.c4 Nf6 3.g3 g6 4.Bg2 Bg7 5.Nf3 O-O 6.O-O d6 7.Nc3 c6
Westphalia Defense in the Queen's Gambit Declined: An alternative name for the Manhattan Variation, 1.d4 d5 2.c4 e6 3.Nc3 Nf6 4.Bg5 Nbd7 5.Nf3 Bb4 or 5.e3 c5
Wiesbaden Variation of the Slav Defense 1.d4 d5 2.c4 c6 3.Nf3 Nf6 4.Nc3 dxc4 5.a4 Bf5 6.Ne5 e6
Wilkes-Barre Variation of the Two Knights Defense 1. e4 e5 2. Nf3 Nc6 3. Bc4 Nf6 4. Ng5 Bc5!?

Y

Yerevan System of the Sicilian Defence 1.e4 c5 2.Nf3 a6 3.Nc3
Yugoslav Attack in the Sicilian Defence, Dragon Variation 1.e4 c5 2.Nf3 d6 3.d4 cxd4 4.Nxd4 Nf6 5.Nc3 g6 6.Be3 Bg7 7.f3
Yugoslav Defense (or Pirc Defense) 1.e4 d6 2.d4 Nf6 3.Nc3 g6
Yugoslav Variation of the King's Indian Defence 1.d4 Nf6 2.c4 g6 3.Nc3 Bg7 4.Nf3 d6 5.g3 0-0 6.Bg2 c5
Yugoslav Variation of the Benko Gambit 1.d4 Nf6 2.c4 c5 3.d5 b5 4.cxb5 a6 5.bxa6 g6 6.Nc3 Bxa6 7.e4 Bxf1 8.Kxf1 d6 9.Nge2

Z

Zagreb Variation of the Sicilian Defence, Najdorf Variation 1.e4 c5 2.Nf3 d6 3.d4 cxd4 4.Nxd4 Nf6 5.Nc3 a6 6.g3
Zaire Defense of the Queen's Knight Defense 1.d4 Nc6 2.d5 Nb8 3.e4 Nf6 4.e5 Ng8
Zurich Gambit 1.d4 d5 2.g4
Zurich Variation of the Nimzo-Indian Defense 1.d4 Nf6 2.c4 e6 3.Nc3 Bb4 4.Qc2 Nc6

A number of less well-accepted ethnic chess opening names (including such gems as the "Anglo-Polish Dutch," 1.c4 f5 2.b4) can be found in this list of chess opening names.

See also
Chess opening
List of chess openings
List of chess openings named after people

Notes

External links
Bill Wall's list of chess openings
ECO Information and Index
Chess Archaeology

+List of chess openings named after places
Openings named after places
Chess openings